The 2012–13 FC Energie Cottbus season is the 48th season in the club's football history. In 2012–13 the club plays in the 2. Fußball-Bundesliga, the second tier of German football. It is the clubs fourth consecutive season in this league, having played at this level since 2009–10, after it was relegated from the Fußball-Bundesliga in 2009.

The club also took part in the 2012–13 edition of the DFB-Pokal, the German Cup, but was knocked out in the first round by fellow second division side SV Sandhausen.

Matches

Legend

Friendly matches

2. Bundesliga

DFB Pokal

Sources

External links
 2012–13 Energie Cottbus season at Weltfussball.de 
 2012–13 Energie Cottbus season at kicker.de 
 2012–13 Energie Cottbus season at Fussballdaten.de 

Energie Cottbus
FC Energie Cottbus seasons